Jason Cavalier Leboeuf, generally credited as Jason Cavalier, is a Canadian stuntman and actor. Leboeuf is originally from Montreal, Quebec. He started in the television series Time of your life as Mickey in 1988.

Selected filmography

Film

Television

Video games

References

External links
 

Year of birth missing (living people)
Living people
Canadian stunt performers
Canadian male television actors